5 Girls is a documentary released in 2001 by Kartemquin Films for PBS's P.O.V. series. The film follows five young women between the ages of 13 and 17.

Directed by Maria Finitzo, 5 Girls made its television premiere on PBS's P.O.V. on October 2, 2001.

At the time of the film's release, The New York Times praised 5 Girls for its "intimacy and candor".  Reminiscent of Michael Apted's classic Up! series, the film unfolds into a bold "sociological portrait" showing the transformation of each girl into a woman.  In 2002, 5 Girls was awarded the Henry Hampton Award for Excellence in Film & Digital Media from the Council on Foundations.  The film also took home The Silver Award from the Chicago Film & Television Competition.

In September 2007, Kartemquin Films released 5 Girls on DVD.

References

External links
 "5 Girls" Official Site
 Kartemquin Films
 
 "5 Girls - P.O.V."

American documentary films
2001 films
POV (TV series) films
2000s feminist films
Documentary films about women in the United States
2001 documentary films
Documentary films about adolescence
Kartemquin Films films
2000s English-language films
2000s American films